Ronnadet Wongsaroj ((born 22 April 1980) is a Thai singer. He graduated at Bangkok Christian College, Mahidol University International College (Salaya) and Chulalongkorn University.

Personal life 
Ronnadet is first son of Jirasak Wongsaroj and Dararat Wongsaroj. He has 1 sister named Ureson Wongsaroj. He is now in a  relationship with Onjira Lamvilai.

Work

Sitcom 
 2013 - Series Club Friday 
 2014 - Heng Heng Heng

References

External links 
 อินสตาแกรมของแหนม รณเดช
 เฟซบุ๊คแฟนเพจของแหนม รณเดช
 ทวิตเตอร์ของแหนม รณเดช

Ronnadet Wongsaroj
Ronnadet Wongsaroj
Ronnadet Wongsaroj
Living people
1980 births